War Memorial Building is a historic community building located at New Martinsville, Wetzel County, West Virginia. It was built in 1929, and is a two-story, buff-colored wire brick building with Neoclassical design elements. The building was dedicated as a living memorial to the World War I veterans and is available for any group in the county to use for meetings or special events. It now serves as a memorial to Wetzel County veterans of all wars. It features a ballroom with hardwood maple floor.

It was listed on the National Register of Historic Places in 1997.

References

Government buildings on the National Register of Historic Places in West Virginia
Neoclassical architecture in West Virginia
Government buildings completed in 1929
Buildings and structures in Wetzel County, West Virginia
National Register of Historic Places in Wetzel County, West Virginia